Dorothy of Sweden or Dorothea of Sweden - Swedish: Dorotea - may refer to:

Dorothea of Brandenburg, Queen consort of Sweden 1447 and 1457
Dorothea of Denmark, Electress Palatine, Princess of Sweden 1520